Incheon (or Inch'ŏn; literally "kind river"), formerly Jemulpo or Chemulp'o (제물포) until the period after 1910, officially the Incheon Metropolitan City (인천광역시, 仁川廣域市), is a city located in northwestern South Korea, bordering Seoul and Gyeonggi to the east. Inhabited since the Neolithic, Incheon was home to just 4,700 people when it became an international port in 1883. Today, about 3 million people live in the city, making it South Korea's third-most-populous city after Seoul and Busan.

The city's growth has been assured in modern times with the development of its port due to its natural advantages as a coastal city and its proximity to the South Korean capital. It is part of the Seoul Capital Area, along with Seoul itself and Gyeonggi Province, forming the world's fourth-largest metropolitan area by population.

Incheon has since led the economic development of South Korea by opening its port to the outside world, ushering in the modernization of South Korea as a center of industrialization. In 2003, the city was designated as South Korea's first free economic zone. Since then, large local companies and global enterprises have increasingly invested in the Incheon Free Economic Zone, including Samsung which chose Songdo International City as its new investment destination for its bio industry.

As an international city, Incheon has held numerous large-scale international conferences, such as the Incheon Global Fair & Festival in 2009. The 17th Asian Games Incheon 2014 was also held in Incheon on 19 September 2014. Incheon has established itself as a major transportation hub in northeast Asia with the Incheon International Airport and Incheon Port.. The large volume of port traffic makes Incheon a Large-Port Metropolis using the Southampton System of Port-City classification.

History
The first historical record of the Incheon area dates back to 475 CE, during the reign of King Jangsu of Goguryeo, by the name of Michuhol, which is supposed to be located on today's Munhak Hill. The area underwent several name changes with successive kingdoms and dynasties. In Goryeo era, Incheon was called Gyeongwon or Inju. The current name was turned to Incheon in 1413.  Later, Incheon County became Incheon Metropolitan Prefecture (dohobu). Old Incheon consisted of today's southern Incheon (i.e. Jung-gu, Dong-gu, Nam-gu, Yeonsu-gu, and Namdong-gu) and the northern part of Siheung City. The city center was Gwangyo-dong, where the prefecture office and the local academy (hyanggyo) were located. The "original" two remaining buildings of the Incheon prefecture office are located in Munhak Elementary School, while the newly built (in 2001) prefecture office buildings are right across from Munhak Baseball Stadium.

Modern history

Another historical name of the city, Jemulpo (alternatively Romanized as Chemulpo), was not widely used until the opening of the port in 1883. It was frequently used until the Japanese annexation. After the opening of the Incheon port, the city center moved from Gwangyo to Jemulpo. Today, either Jemulpo or Gwangyo-dong is considered "Original Incheon". It was internationally known as Jinsen during Japanese rule, based on the Japanese pronunciation of Incheon's Chinese name. 

In 1914, the Japanese colonial government merged outer parts of old Incheon (including the former center of Gwangyo) with Bupyeong County, forming Bucheon County. Between 1936 and 1940, some part of Bucheon County was recombined into Incheon City, by which some part of "old" Bupyeong was annexed into Incheon.

Incheon was originally part of Gyeonggi Province, but was granted Directly Governed (now Metropolitan) City status on 1 July 1981; the city officially separated from the province. In 1989, neighboring islands and Gyeyang township of Gimpo County were ceded to Incheon and in 1995 Geomdan township of Gimpo Country and two counties of Ganghwa and Onjin were annexed to Incheon Metropolitan City.

Incheon was known as Inchon prior to South Korea's adoption of a new Romanization system in 2000.

Major events 
The city was the site of the Battle of Chemulpo Bay, where the first shots of the Russo-Japanese War were fired.

During the Korean War, Incheon was occupied by North Korean troops on 4 July 1950. Incheon was the site of the Battle of Inchon when the United States troops landed to relieve pressure on the Pusan Perimeter and to launch a United Nations offensive northward. The result was a decisive UN victory and it was recaptured on 19 September 1950.  was named after the tide-turning battle that ensued.

Incheon has also hosted a series of major international events. The Global Fair & Festival 2009 Incheon was held in the Songdo District in August 2009.  It was open from 7 August to 25 October for a period of 80 days. It was a comprehensive international event with global institutions and corporations as participants. Various musicians and artists performed during the event.

The city hosted a meeting of the G20 Finance Ministers in February 2010. Incheon was the site of the third Global Model United Nations Conference, held from 10 to 14 August 2011.

It first hosted the Incheon Women Artists' Biennale in 2004 which expanded into welcoming international artists in its subsequent 2007, 2009 and 2011.

Incheon hosted the Asian Games in 2014. It hosted the 6th OECD World Forum in 2018.

Incheon was designated as the World Book Capital for the year 2015 by UNESCO.

Education
On 27 February 2007, Incheon declared itself an "English City," and inaugurated the "Incheon Free English Zone" program. The goal of the program is to make the city as proficient in English as Singapore. This is for the ultimate purpose of establishing Incheon as a commercial and business hub of northeast Asia (see Free Economic Zone below). The official slogan of the program is "Smile with English."

Higher education
Incheon is home to a number of colleges and universities:
 George Mason University Korea Campus
 Ghent University Global Campus
 Gyeongin National University of Education Incheon campus
 Inha University (formerly Inha Institute of Technology)
 Gachon University Medical·Ganghwa campus
 Gyeongin Women's College
 Inha Technical College
 Incheon Catholic University
 Incheon City College
 Incheon National University
 Jaineung College
 University of Utah Asia Campus
 SUNY South Korea
 Anyang University Ganghwa campus
 Yonsei University International campus
 Korea Polytechnics II
 Seongsan Hyo University
 Juan International University

Primary and secondary schools
International schools:
 Chadwick International School Songdo
 Overseas Chinese Primary and Middle/High School, Incheon (인천화교소·중산중고등학교)
 Cheongna Dalton School

Climate 
Incheon has a humid subtropical climate (Köppen: Cwa), and humid continental climate (Köppen Dwa, respectively). Like other metropolitan cities, incheon has a strong urban heat island effect. Incheon's climate is about average compared to the rest of Korea, with 8 locations being cooler and 10 locations being warmer, and with 9 locations being wetter and 9 locations being drier.

Incheon experiences each of its four seasons, distinctly feeling the rise and fall of temperature and humidity. The temperature however, never rises to an extreme, and the climate of the city is essentially mild. Incheon is swept by the seasonal winds as the northwesterly winds strike the city in the winter and the summer in Incheon is affected by gusts of the warm southwesterly winds.

Economy
Incheon forms the heart of Capital Industrial Region. During the industrialization of South Korea, several industrial complexes were built throughout the city, and as a result, the city was largely dependent on manufacturing industry. But with the designation of Incheon Free Economic Zone in 2003, the city is now making an effort to foster new growth industries. Major industrial parks include Bupyeong industrial complex, which hosts GM Incheon plant(formerly a GM Daewoo Incheon plant), Juan industrial complex, and Namdong Industrial complex.

In recent years, bio industry is emerging as a new growth industry of the city. Currently, with the total production capacity of 330kℓ per year, the city ranks 2nd in the world by production capacity along with San Francisco, United States. The capacity is under expansion, and after completion in 2018, the city will rank 1st with the production capacity of 510kℓ. Also, logistics industry is also experiencing a rapid growth, thanks to Incheon Airport, which was ranked fourth in the world by cargo traffic, and the expansion of Incheon Port.

Transportation
Incheon is a major domestic and international transport hub for Korea.

Air 
Incheon International Airport is South Korea's primary international airport and a regional air hub. In 2015, it was the world's 22nd busiest airport by passenger traffic, with 49,412,750 passengers.

There were a total of 305,446 flights (300,634 international, 4,812 domestic) to and from Incheon International Airport in 2015, an average of 837 flights (824 international, 13 domestic) daily. Korea's two main carriers, Korean Air and Asiana Airlines, serviced 50.9% of flights, while low-cost and foreign carriers serviced the remaining 49.1% of flights. The airport is experiencing a rapid increase in passengers, and the opening of Terminal 2 in December 2017 spurred additional traffic.

The airport was also featured in the Korean drama series, "Air City."

Incheon International Airport ranked "5th in the world" among international airports.

Sea 
Incheon's sea port is the second largest port in Korea after Busan Port.

The International Passenger Terminal located at the port offers ferries to five cities in China: Dalian, Qingdao, Tianjin, Dandong, and Weihai. There are also ferries to Incheon's outlying islands as well as Baengnyeong Island inside of the Northern Limit Line.

Bus 
Incheon Bus Terminal, located at its eponymous subway stop, offers express bus transportation to all parts of Korea. Many city bus lines offer transportation within city limits as well as to the neighboring cities of Bucheon, Gimpo, Seoul, and Siheung.

Many intercity buses offer transportation between Seoul and Incheon.

Train
Local service to Guro, Seoul, Cheongnyangni, Uijeongbu and Soyosan is offered by Seoul's subway Line 1. The line has 11 stations within Incheon and connects to the Incheon Subway at Bupyeong and Juan stations.

Rapid service on the same line to Yongsan Station in Seoul depart from Dongincheon station and stops at major stations.

The Airport Express (AREX) line runs from Incheon International Airport to Seoul Station via Gimpo International Airport. The Incheon-Gimpo section was opened in March 2007 and was extended to Seoul station in December 2010. Passengers can choose a high-speed service stopping only at Incheon airport and Seoul, which takes 43 minutes but departs only every half-hour; or the all-station service which takes 53 minutes but leaves every six minutes.

KTX service was introduced on the AREX line on 30 June 2014, with stops at Incheon International Airport Station and Geoman Station. There are additional plans to use the newly built Suin Line to bring KTX service to Incheon Station by 2021.

Subway 

The Incheon Subway has two subway lines serving the city. The first line connects to the Seoul Metropolitan Subway system at Bupyeong Station (Seoul Subway Line 1), and AREX line at Gyeyang Station. It connects International Business District Station in Songdo to Gyeyang Station. The line also has transfer stations with the Suin Line at Woninjae Station, with the Incheon Subway Line 2 at Incheon City Hall Station, and with Seoul Subway Line 7 at Bupyeong-gu Office Station. Incheon Subway Line 2 opened in July 2016 and runs from Geomdan Oryu Station to Unyeon Station.

The Incheon subway is operated by the Incheon Rapid Transit Corporation (IRTC).

There are additional plans for a third subway line in Incheon.

Korail has also constructed a new commuter rail line named Suin Line. The line opened in 2012 from Oido Station in Siheung to Songdo Station in Incheon. It was then extended in 2016, and now reaches Incheon Station where passengers can transfer to Seoul Subway Line 1. In 2020, the line was extended from Oido Station to Suwon Station.

SMRT (one of three operating companies of Seoul Metropolitan Subway) has extended Seoul Metropolitan Subway Line 7 to Bupyeong-gu office by 2011 and provided transfers to the Incheon Subway system. It has 3 stations within Incheon. By 2020, the line will further be extended westwards to Seoknam Station where it will be possible to transfer to Incheon Subway Line 2.

Free Economic Zone

The goal of IFEZ is to transform these three areas into hubs for logistics, international business, leisure, and tourism for the Northeast Asian region. The term 'Free Economic Zone' applies to the development in these three areas with the aim of improving the business environment for foreign-invested enterprises and the living conditions for foreigners. The zone is a specially designated area to create the most favorable business and living environment where foreign nationals can live and invest freely and conveniently. Incheon's Free Economic Zone, the first in Korea, was officially designated by the Korean government in August 2003. IFEZ is planned to be a self-contained living and business district featuring air and sea transportation, a logistics complex, an international business center, financial services, residences, schools and hospitals, and shopping and entertainment centres.

New Songdo City

Songdo International City began development in 1994 and is being built on reclaimed land. It is designated to become a center of diverse international businesses, a hub for international trade, an area for knowledge-based technologies, and a place for eco-friendly urban living. Construction is due to be completed in 2020.

 Development size: 
 Planned population: 252,000 persons
 Construction duration: 1994~2020

Yeongjong Island 
, Yeongjong International City's  centering on the Incheon International Airport is being developed as an eco-friendly airport city scheduled to be completed by 2020.
Paradise Co, a South Korean casino operator, said in October 2013 that it will build the country's largest casino on Yeongjong Island.

Cheongna 

The Cheongna district, on the mainland adjacent Yeongjong Island, will focus on entertainment and will feature a world class theme park.  It will also be a residential area with sports facilities, a floriculture complex, and a business area specially designed for international finance.

 Development Size: 
 Planned population: 90,000 persons
 Duration: 2004~2008

Administrative divisions

Incheon is divided into 8 districts (gu) and 2 counties (gun).

 Bupyeong District
 Dong District
 Gyeyang District
 Jung District
 Michuhol District
 Namdong District
 Seo District
 Yeonsu District
 Ganghwa County
 Ongjin County

Demographics

According to the 2015 census, 32.6% of the population follow Christianity (23.1% Protestantism and 9.5% Catholicism) and 8.7% follow Buddhism. 57.9% of the population is irreligious. 0.8% of the population follow other religions including Islam, Muism, and Confucianism.

Sports

Incheon is home to the following professional and semi professional sports teams:

Association football:
The K League 1 team Incheon United FC.
The Incheon team was known to have a popular rivalry against former Bucheon SK (now Jeju United), due to the teams' close geographical relationship.

The K4 League team FC Namdong is based in the Namdong District of Incheon.

The WK League team is named Hyundai Steel Red Angels.

Baseball:
The KBO League team SSG Landers.
The first Incheon-based professional baseball team were Sammi Superstars.

Basketball:
The WKBL team Incheon Shinhan Bank S-Birds is based in Incheon. Between 1997 and 2021, Incheon hosted the KBL team Incheon Electroland Elephants.

Volleyball:
The V-League teams are Incheon Korean Air Jumbos (men's) and Incheon Heungkuk Life Pink Spiders (women's).

Munhak Sports Complex:
The Munhak Sports Complex houses both a football stadium and a baseball stadium. The football stadium was Incheon's venue for the 2002 Football World Cup, and is also the home venue for Incheon United. The baseball stadium is the home venue for the SSG Landers.

In April 2007, Incheon was selected as the host city for the 2014 Asian Games, beating out New Delhi.

Yeonhui Cricket Ground:
Yeonhui Cricket Ground is a purpose-built cricket stadium in Incheon built for cricket events at the 2014 Asian Games. The 2014 Asian Games featured cricket for both the men's and the women's event and this ground was used for the scheduled cricket matches played at the games. It is the first cricket stadium in South Korea.

Incheon Football Stadium (Sungui Arena):
Incheon Football Stadium is the first football-only stadium in Incheon. It was built in 2012 with a capacity for 20,891 spectators.

Points of interest

A number of Korea's western islands, including Ganghwa Island, Yeongjong Island, and Baengnyeong Island are also administered by Incheon. Baengnyeong Island is South Korea's westernmost point.

Bupyeong Station is where the Seoul Subway Line 1 and Incheon subway line intersect. There is a large under ground shopping center there mostly selling trendy women's clothing and cell phones. Above ground, there are many restaurants, additional shops, and a Lotte Mart. Bupyeong Station Underground Shopping Centre has 1,408 stores in 31,692m (official statistics from the National Archives of Korea), was officially certified as the place with the largest number of stores in the world by American World Record Academy in November 2014.
Jayu (Freedom) Park is a park near the city's port. The statue of General Douglas MacArthur, as well as a memorial to the centennial anniversary of U.S. and Korea relations is located there.
Chinatown is Korea's only official Chinatown, located across from Incheon Station near Jayu Park.
Incheon Bus Terminal refers to an area surrounding the city's bus terminal.  There is also a performance venue and a subway station. Within this area of Guwol-dong is Rodeo Street, a busy central square packed with restaurants and department stores.
Wolmido is the location of Green Beach, one of the landing sites for MacArthur's invasion force. It is now a local tourist attraction with a boardwalk, an amusement park and many raw fish restaurants. Ferries run from Wolmido to Yeongjongdo and Jakyakdo.
Jakyakdo is a tiny island located in the harbor close between Wolmido and Yeongjongdo. There are many walkways and picnic spots, a restaurant, and seasonal rental rooms.
Incheon Landing Operation Memorial Hall is a plaza and small museum dedicated to the Incheon Landing. Weapons and artifacts from the war and operation are displayed.
Incheon Dohobu Cheongsa is the old government complex for Incheon. Located near Munhak Stadium, it has existed since at least the reign of King Sejong, about 1424 AD.
Ara Canal is a waterway connecting the Han River and the Yellow Sea.  Along the canal is a park and a bike path that is increasingly becoming popular with the locals.
Korean-chinese cultural center was built by the Jung-gu District of Incheon to facilitate mutual understanding between Korea and China.
Songwol-dong Fairy Tale Village was born from a renovation project to improve the envelopment of the village, and is now a main attraction amongst young people and children.
Peking opera wallis located in the heart of the Chinatown.

Notable people

Lee Je-no, member of NCT and its subunit NCT Dream
Miyeon, (G)I-dle
Hapkido Grand Master Han Bong-soo
Hangzoo, Rhythm Power
Myung Jae-nam
Kim Ryeo-wook, Super Junior
Kim Hyo-yeon, Girls' Generation
Choi Min-ho, Shinee
Kang Ki-young
Michaela Dietz, voice actress
Kim Gu-ra
Kim Nam-il, footballer
Cho Yong-hyung, footballer
Shin Ji, Koyote
Yoon Chae-kyung, April
Kang Hye-jung, actress
Kim Eun-jung, footballer
Go Kyung-pyo, actor
Lee Sung-hyun, kickboxer
Choi Ji-man, baseball player (New York Yankees, Milwaukee Brewers, Tampa Bay Rays)
Bang Yong-guk, B.A.P
Ku Hye-sun, actress
Hyolyn, Sistar
Roh Ji-hoon, singer
Ryu Hyun-jin, baseball player (Hanwha Eagles, Los Angeles Dodgers, Toronto Blue Jays)
Park Cho-a, soloist and former member of AOA
 Park Chae-Won (known as Gowon), singer (Loona).
Bang Min-ah, Girl's Day
Nam Ji-hyun
Kyung Soo-jin
Kim Young-kwang
Sohyang, singer, author
JinJoo Lee, DNCE
Ong Seong-wu, former member of Wanna One, actor and soloist
Yoo Seung-ho, actor
Lee Kang-in, footballer
Jung Seung-hwan, singer
Kim Sung-joo, singer, actor, UNIQ
Sung Dong-il, actor
Sohee, singer and member of  Alice
Park Nam-choon
Doyeon, singer, actress and member of Weki Meki and WJMK
Young Kim
Hong Soo-hyun, actress
Peggy Gou, DJ
Jeong Ye-in, singer and member of Lovelyz
Eunseo, singer and member of WJSN
Seo Ji-soo, singer and member of Lovelyz
Kim Won-pil, singer-songwriter, keyboardist and member of Day6
Han Ji-sung, rapper, singer, producer songwriter and member of Stray Kids
Do Han-se, rapper and member of Victon
Oh Haewon, singer and leader of NMIXX

International relations

Incheon is twinned with:

 Alexandria, Egypt (2000)
 Anchorage, United States (1986)
 Banten, Indonesia (2009)
 Burbank, United States (1961)
 Chongqing, China (2007)
 Haiphong, Vietnam (1997)
 Honolulu, United States (2003)
 Kitakyushu, Japan (1988)
 Kobe, Japan (2010)
 Kolkata, India (2007)
 Manila, Philippines (2008)
 Mérida, Mexico (2007)
 Panama City, Panama (2000)
 Philadelphia, United States (1983)
 Phnom Penh, Cambodia (2009)
 Shenyang, China (2014)
 Taoyuan, Taiwan (2009)
 Tel Aviv, Israel (2000)
 Ulaanbaatar, Mongolia (2017)
 Veneto, Italy (2010)
 Vladivostok, Russia (2012)
 Yekaterinburg, Russia (2009)

See also 

 List of cities in South Korea
 List of East Asian ports
 Battle of Chemulpo Bay
 Inchon
 Incheon Chinatown

References

External links 

  
 National Institute of Biological Resources on Google Cultural Institute

 
Seoul Capital Area
Special Cities and Metropolitan Cities of South Korea
Port cities and towns in South Korea